"Fallen Angels" is the third single by the American rock band, Black Veil Brides, and the first single from their second album Set the World on Fire. The song is inspired by the biblical story told in Revelation 12, in which Satan and one-third of God's angels rebelled against God, starting a war in Heaven and were therefore cast out of Heaven to the Earth, becoming "fallen angels." The story was introduced to Andy Biersack and the Black Veil Brides by their band artist Richard Villa:

Music video 
A music video for the song was released on YouTube on May 23, 2011, directed by Nathan Cox. The video was subsequently released on iTunes. The video depicts the five members of Black Veil Brides falling from outer space and crashing to the earth riding on comets. When they land, they emerge and begin performing the song as a crowd gathers around them in support.

Track listing 
CD single

Personnel 
Black Veil Brides
 Andy Biersack - lead vocals
 Jake Pitts - lead guitar
 Jinxx - rhythm guitar
 Ashley Purdy - bass, backing vocals
 Christian "CC" Coma - drums, percussion

Production
 Nathan Cox - direction

Charts

References 

2011 singles
Black Veil Brides songs
Songs written by Andy Biersack
2011 songs
Songs based on the Bible
Song recordings produced by Josh Abraham
War in Heaven